The Most Refulgent Order of the Star of Nepal ( Nepal Taradisha) is an award of Nepal.

History 
It was instituted by King Tribhubhan Bir Bikram Shah Dev on 19 November 1918. Attached to the order is a medal (Nepal-Tara-Padak) instituted by King Tribhuvan in 1936.

Grades 
The order consists of the Sovereign, Grand Master and ordinary members.  For the ordinary members there are five grades and an associated medal (Nepal Tara Padak) The order is presented for outstanding civil or military merit.:

 Member First Class (Supradipta-Manyabara-Nepal-Tara)
 Member Second Class (Pradipta-Manyabara-Nepal-Tara)
 Member Third Class (Manyabara-Nepal-Tara)
 Member Fourth Class (Manya-Nepal-Tara)
 Member Fifth Class (Nepal-Tara)
 Medal (Nepal-Tara-Padak)

Notable recipients

 FM Sir Claude Auchinleck (1945)
 Rt Hon Sir Winston Churchill (1961)
 Boutros Boutros-Ghali
 Bhanbhagta Gurung
 Louis Mountbatten, 1st Earl Mountbatten of Burma (1946)
 Tenzing Norgay
 Baber Shamsher Jang Bahadur Rana
 Kiran Shamsher Rana
 Pasang Lhamu Sherpa
 Archibald Wavell, 1st Earl Wavell
 Benito Mussolini (17 July 1935)
Chutra Bahadur Thapa
 Nabal Shah
 Bharat Man Shrestha

References

 
Star of Nepal
Awards established in 1918
1918 establishments in Nepal